Nelima doriae is a species of harvestman in the family Sclerosomatidae.

Etymology
The specific name, doriae, is in honor of Italian naturalist Giacomo Doria.

Subspecies
N.d. doriae (Canestrini, 1872)
N.d. dalmatina Hadži, 1973

Distribution
This species can be found in  Southern Europe. It is also present in Argentina and New Zealand (introduced).

Description
The upper body is dark yellowish, with round golden specks, more evident along the midline. The fourth last ring of the abdomen shows a golden transverse band. Palps and jaws are yellow. The legs are yellowish with white joints.

References

External links
 Les Araignées de Belgique et de France

Harvestmen